This is a list of public hospitals in the United States.

Currently operating
 Arizona
 Valleywise Health (formerly Maricopa Integrated Health System)
 Valleywise Health Medical Center (Phoenix)

 California
 Los Angeles County Department of Health Services
 LAC+USC Medical Center (Los Angeles)
 Harbor-UCLA Medical Center
 Olive View-UCLA Medical Center
 San Francisco Department of Public Health
 San Francisco General Hospital

 Florida
 Jackson Memorial Hospital (operated by Miami-Dade County) (Miami)
 Broward Health

 Georgia
 Grady Memorial Hospital (Atlanta)

 Illinois
 John H. Stroger Jr. Hospital of Cook County (Chicago)
 Provident Hospital (Chicago)

 Indiana
 Sidney & Lois Eskenazi Hospital (Indianapolis)

 Minnesota
 Hennepin County Medical Center

 Mississippi
 Greenwood Leflore Hospital - Jointly owned by the City of Greenwood and Leflore County

 New York
 NYC Health + Hospitals
 NYC Health + Hospitals/Bellevue
 NYC Health + Hospitals/Coney Island
 NYC Health + Hospitals/Elmhurst
 NYC Health + Hospitals/Harlem
 NYC Health + Hospitals/Jacobi
 NYC Health + Hospitals/Kings County
 NYC Health + Hospitals/Lincoln
 NYC Health + Hospitals/Metropolitan
 NYC Health + Hospitals/North Central Bronx
 NYC Health + Hospitals/Queens
 NYC Health + Hospitals/Woodhull

 North Carolina
 Atrium Health (Mecklenburg County)
 Carolinas Medical Center (Charlotte)

 Tennessee
 West Tennessee Healthcare (Jackson-Madison County General Hospital District)

 Texas
 Brooke Army Medical Center
 Harris Health (Harris County)
 Ben Taub Hospital (Houston)
 Lyndon B. Johnson General Hospital  (Houston)
 JPS Health Network (Tarrant County)
 John Peter Smith Hospital (Fort Worth)
 Parkland Health & Hospital System (Dallas County)
 Parkland Memorial Hospital (Dallas)
 University Health System (Bexar County)
 University Hospital

Former hospitals
 Boston City Hospital
 Brackenridge Hospital (Austin, Texas)
 Detroit General Hospital (privatized, now Detroit Receiving Hospital)
 Greenville General Hospital (of the Greenville Health Authority), owned by the city of Greenville, SC. It continues to own the hospital facility but leases management to Prisma Health, which operates it as Prisma Health Greenville Memorial Hospital.
 Martin Luther King Jr./Drew Medical Center (Los Angeles County, California)
 New Hanover Regional Medical Center (Wilmington, North Carolina) - Formerly operated by New Hanover County. In February 2021 Novant Health, a nonprofit private organization, acquired the hospital. Due to the acquisition it is no longer a public hospital.
 Tampa General Hospital (formerly Tampa Municipal Hospital) - Became a private hospital circa 1997

See also
 Central Health - Hospital district of Travis County, Texas

References

public hospitals